Wheels is the nickname of:

 Eric Magennis (born 1937 or 1938), Australian Paralympic lawn bowls player and archer
 Michael Russell (tennis) (born 1978), American tennis player
 Matthew Whelan (born 1979), former Australian rules football player
 Brian Wheeler, play-by-play radio announcer for the Portland Trail Blazers of the National Basketball Association
 Chris Wheeler (born 1945), former announcer and color commentator for the Philadelphia Phillies of Major League Baseball
 Derek Wheeler, fictional character on the TV series Degrassi Junior High and Degrassi High

See also 

 Elbert Dubenion (1933–2019), American football player nicknamed "Golden Wheels"
 Steve Wozniak (born 1950), American inventor, electronics engineer, computer programmer and co-founder of Apple Computer, whose nickname "WoZ" stands for "Wheels of Zeus"

Lists of people by nickname